+ (the plus sign) is a binary operator that indicates addition.

+ may also refer to:

 +, the international call prefix used with International direct dialing
 +, positive electric charge

Computer science
Concatenation, represented by a + in some programming languages
Operator (computer programming), represented by +, among other symbols
Plus (programming language), a programming language created in 1976

Music
+ (album) (pronounced "plus"), a 2011 by Ed Sheeran
 _+, the title given to the deluxe edition of _ (album) by BT, 2016
"+" (song) (pronounced "mas"), a 2019 song by Aitana and Cali y El Dandee
 "+", a 2002 song by Ayumi Hamasaki from Rainbow

See also

++ (disambiguation)
+ +, a 2018 EP by Loona
+++ (disambiguation)

x (disambiguation)
Plus (disambiguation)
Cross (disambiguation)